John Russel Bohan (December 7, 1824 – November 14, 1886) was an Irish American immigrant, newspaper publisher, and politician.  He was a member of the Wisconsin State Assembly and the Wisconsin State Senate, and served several local and county offices in Ozaukee County, Wisconsin.

Biography
Bohan was born on December 7, 1824, near Templemore, Ireland, and immigrated to the United States with his family. He moved to Hartford, Wisconsin in 1846. In 1852, he married Mary Katharina Sullivan. They had nine children. He was the editor of the Ozaukee County Advertiser. Bohan died in 1886 after being struck by a train.

Career
Bohan was a member of the Assembly in 1859 and was later returned to office in 1872. He was a member of the Wisconsin Senate for one term, covering 1863 and 1864. Additionally, he was Chairman of Port Washington, Wisconsin, and of the Ozaukee County Democratic Committee, as well as a justice of the peace.

References

19th-century Irish people
Politicians from County Tipperary
Irish emigrants to the United States (before 1923)
People from Hartford, Wisconsin
People from Port Washington, Wisconsin
Democratic Party Wisconsin state senators
Democratic Party members of the Wisconsin State Assembly
Mayors of places in Wisconsin
American justices of the peace
1824 births
1886 deaths
Railway accident deaths in the United States
19th-century American politicians
19th-century American judges